The Leadstar is the second solo album by Sonata Arctica guitarist Elias Viljanen released by Lion Music.

Track listing
 "Lord of the Strings" - 01:24
 "High-Powered" - 03:45
 "Touching the Sky" - 04:28
 "Unity for Life" - 03:09
 "Northern Storm" - 03:16
 "Fast & Furious" - 04:31
 "Magic Seven" - 03:27
 "Follow the Leadstar" - 04:10
 "Driving Force" - 04:07
 "Hello (Lionel Richie Cover)" - 04:05
 "Evilized" - 02:23
 "Home-Coming" - 02:44

Personnel
 Elias Viljanen - Guitars
 Rami Herckman - Bass guitar
 Tomi Ylönen - Drums
 Jari Koivisto - Guitars
 Jukka Talasmäki - Guitars

Guest musicians
 Lacu Lahtinen - Drums
 Jani Kemppinen - Keyboards
 Jaan Wessman - Bass guitar
 Lars Eric Mattsson - Guitars
 Janne Juutinen - Drums
 John Kärppä - Guitars

2005 albums